The Roman Catholic Diocese of Gaoua is a diocese located in the city of Gaoua in the Ecclesiastical province of Bobo-Dioulasso in Burkina Faso.

History
 November 30, 2011: Established as Diocese of Gaoua from the Diocese of Diébougou.

Leadership
 Bishops of Gaoua (Roman rite)
 Bishop Modeste Kambou (November 30, 2011 - )

See also
Roman Catholicism in Burkina Faso

Sources
 GCatholic.org

References

Roman Catholic dioceses in Burkina Faso
Christian organizations established in 2011
Gaoua, Roman Catholic Diocese of
Gaoua, Roman Catholic Diocese of